The Arrats is a 162 km long river in southern France, left tributary of the Garonne. Its source is in the northern foothills of the Pyrenees, near Sariac-Magnoac. It flows north through the following départements and towns:
 Hautes-Pyrénées 
 Gers: Castelnau-Barbarens, Aubiet, Mauvezin, Saint-Clar
 Tarn-et-Garonne: Saint-Loup 

It flows into the Garonne near Valence, between Castelsarrasin and Agen.

References

Rivers of France
Rivers of Gers
Rivers of Tarn-et-Garonne
Rivers of Hautes-Pyrénées
Rivers of Occitania (administrative region)